Loeser is a surname. Notable people with the surname include:

 Arthur E. Loeser (born 1903), appointed to the United States Naval Academy on 15 August 1923
 Ewald Loeser (1888–1970), German lawyer
 François Loeser (born 1958), French mathematician
 Hans F. Loeser (1920–2010), American lawyer
 Wilhelm Loeser (1876–1953), American physician and pharmacist